Olafur Davidsson (1862–1903), Icelandic: Ólafur Davíðsson, was an Icelandic natural scientist, ethnographer and folklore collector.

Davidsson was born on 26 January 1862 at Fell in Sléttuhlíð. He was a student at The Learned School in Reykjavik from 1874 to 1882 and kept a diary of his last year of study there.

Davidsson studied natural sciences at the University of Copenhagen but then immediately turned to ethnology, working at the Arnamagnæan Institute.

In 1897, Davidsson returned to Iceland and was a part-time teacher at Möðruvellir in Hörgárdal, where he also engaged in folklore collecting and other scholarly work. Ólafur drowned in Hörgá, single and childless, on 6 September 1903.

Works 
 Íslenskar gátur, skemtanir, vikivakar og þulur: safnað hafa J. Árnason og Ó. Davíðsson ("Icelandic Riddles, Entertainment, Weekends and Rhymes: collected by J Arnason and O. Davidsson"), 1–4, Kaupmannahöfn, Bókmenntafélagið, 1887-1903
 Galdur og galdramál á Íslandi ("Magic and Sorcery in Iceland"), 1–3, Reykjavík, Sögufélag, 1941-1943
 Ég læt allt fjúka: sendibréf og dagbókarbrot frá skólaárunum ("I let Everything Blow: Letters and Diary Extracts from the School Years"), Reykjavík, Ísafoldarprentsmiðja, 1955
 Íslenskar þjóðsögur, 1–4, Reykjavík, Þjóðsaga, 1978-1980
Hundakæti: Dagbækur Ólafs Davíðssonar 1881-1884. ("Hundakaeti: the Diaries of Olaf Davidsson, 1881-1884"). Reykjavík, Mál & menning, 2018

References

External links 
 Grímseyjarför, comedy letter by Olafur Davidsson written 8.8.1898, published in Lesbók Morgunblaðsins, 23rd Issue, (08.06.1941), p. 193

Olafur Davidsson
Olafur Davidsson
Olafur Davidsson
1862 births
1903 deaths
19th-century memoirists